In Greek mythology, Demonice was a Aetolian princess as the daughter of King Agenor of Pleuron and Epicaste and thus sister of Porthaon and in some account, Thestius. She bore Ares four sons: Evenus, Molus, Pylus, and Thestius. Her son's names may be intended to be eponyms, with Evenus corresponding to the river Evinos in Aetolia; Pylus to the Aetolian city of Pylene between the rivers Achelous and Evenos; and Molus to the people named Molossians from Epirus. Demonice was also known as Demodice (Δημοδίκη) or Demodoce.

Mythology 
Demonice was recounted by Hesiod in his Catalogue of Women in the following lines:Demodoce whom very many of men on earth, mighty princes, wooed, promising splendid gifts, because of her exceeding beauty.

Notes

References 

 Apollodorus, The Library with an English Translation by Sir James George Frazer, F.B.A., F.R.S. in 2 Volumes, Cambridge, MA, Harvard University Press; London, William Heinemann Ltd. 1921. . Online version at the Perseus Digital Library. Greek text available from the same website.
Pausanias, Description of Greece with an English Translation by W.H.S. Jones, Litt.D., and H.A. Ormerod, M.A., in 4 Volumes. Cambridge, MA, Harvard University Press; London, William Heinemann Ltd. 1918. . Online version at the Perseus Digital Library
 Pausanias, Graeciae Descriptio. 3 vols. Leipzig, Teubner. 1903.  Greek text available at the Perseus Digital Library.

Women of Ares
Mortal parents of demigods in classical mythology
Women in Greek mythology
Aetolian characters in Greek mythology